Cauvin is a surname. Notable people with the surname include:

André Cauvin (1907–2004), a Belgian documentary film director
Gérard Cauvin (died 1531), the father of the Protestant Reformer John Calvin
Jacques Cauvin (1930–2001), French archaeologist
Patrick Cauvin (1932–2010), French writer
Raoul Cauvin (born 1938), Belgian comics writer
Sophie Cauvin (born 1968), Belgian painter

See also
Cauvin Bank, wholly submerged atoll structure in the Southern Part Chagos Archipelago
John Calvin (born Jehan Cauvin in 1509–1564), French theologian